is a former JR West Kabe Line station located in Kake, Yamagata District, Hiroshima Prefecture, Japan. It closed on December 1, 2003, when operation of the line was discontinued/suspended between Kabe Station and Sandankyō Station.

Lines 
West Japan Railway Company
Kabe Line

Adjacent stations 

Railway stations in Hiroshima Prefecture
Kabe Line suspended stations
Railway stations closed in 2003
Railway stations in Japan opened in 1954